A Compton generator or Compton tube is an apparatus for experiment to demonstrate the Earth's rotation, similar to the Foucault pendulum and to gyroscope devices.

Explanation of apparatus 

A Compton generator is a circular hollow glass ring tube shaped like a doughnut, the inside of which is filled with water. If the ring lies flat on the table, the water in the ring is stationary, and it is then turned over by rotating itself 180 degree around a diameter, such that it again lies flat on the table surface, which is horizontal. The result of the experiment is that the water moves with a certain constant drift velocity around the tube after the doughnut has been rotated. If there were no friction with the walls, the water would continue to circulate indefinitely.

The ring used in the initial experiment was made of one inch brass tubing bent into a circle eighteen inches in diameter, where the windows were placed the tube was constricted to a diameter of about three eights of an inch.

Compton used small droplets of coal oil mixed in the water to measure the drift velocity under a microscope.

Analysis 

Initially the ring is horizontal and the water is stationary. Second the ring is then quickly rotated by 180° around its East-West diameter and stopped, such that it again lies flat on the table surface, which is horizontal. At this time, the velocity   of the water in the tube is given by

Note that a rotation from the vertical to the vertical position produces the velocity  of the water in the tube is given by

Experimental verification 
Compton used this measured drift velocity to determine his latitude to within 3% accuracy.

References

Bibliography

Journal

Books 
 
 
 

Physics experiments